The Kishenehn Ranger Station in Glacier National Park was originally built in 1913, but a fire burned it down in 1919. They rebuilt it in 1921. Located nearly five miles south of the Canada–United States border, the log cabin was one of the earliest administrative structures in the park. The cabin was designed in an early version of what became the National Park Service Rustic style.

References

Ranger stations in Glacier National Park (U.S.)
Park buildings and structures on the National Register of Historic Places in Montana
Residential buildings completed in 1921
Rustic architecture in Montana
Historic districts on the National Register of Historic Places in Montana
National Register of Historic Places in Flathead County, Montana
Log buildings and structures on the National Register of Historic Places in Montana
National Register of Historic Places in Glacier National Park
Burned buildings and structures in the United States
Rebuilt buildings and structures in the United States
1921 establishments in Montana